The Ferris Wheel is a 1993 Swedish drama film directed by Clas Lindberg. Lindberg won the award for Best Director at the 29th Guldbagge Awards. It was also nominated for Best Film and Helena Bergström won the award for Best Actress.

Cast
 Jakob Eklund as Mårten
 Helena Bergström as Kickan
 Claes Malmberg as Risto
 Christer Banck as Raymond
 Peter Hüttner as Chief Inspector Stark
 Robert Gustafsson as Karlberg
 Göran Boberg as Supervisor
 Jessica Zandén as Mrs. Lindström
 Lena-Pia Bernhardsson as Secretary
 Lars Göran Persson as Knut Kallsten
 Regina Lund as Agneta Pligberg

References

External links
 
 

1993 films
1993 drama films
Swedish drama films
1990s Swedish-language films
Films whose director won the Best Director Guldbagge Award
Films directed by Clas Lindberg
1990s Swedish films